Bo Tage Georg Ljungfeldt (26 February 1922 – 25 January 1988) was a Swedish racecar driver and a Ford rally factory driver.

Life 
He was born in the municipality of Ekerö and won 6.5 Swedish championship gold medals in racing. He died in Ekerö.

In 1964, he finished second in the Monte Carlo rally.

Family 
His son Conny Ljungfeldt (born 1950) is a two-time Swedish champion in Formula 3 (1975–1976).

References

External links 

 The ex-Bo Ljungfeldt, Monte Carlo Rally class-winning,1963 Ford Falcon Futura
 Ford Falcon Futura - Bo Ljungfeld

Swedish racing drivers
People from Ekerö Municipality
1922 births
1988 deaths
Sportspeople from Stockholm County